Gazan (also Romanized as Gazān; also known as Qazān) is a village in Arabkhaneh Rural District, Shusef District, Nehbandan County, South Khorasan Province, Iran. At the 2006 census, its population was 105, in 34 families.

References 

Populated places in Nehbandan County